Lipu is a county-level city in the northeast of Guangxi, China.

Lipu has a population of 370,000 (2002). It covers an area of 1759 square kilometers. The seat of the city is at Lipu Town (荔浦镇).

Lipu is divided into Licheng Town, Dongchang Town, Xinping Town, Dumo Town, Qingshan Town, Xiuren Town, Datang Town, Huaqi Town, Shuangjiang Town, Maling Town, Longhuai Township, Chacheng Township and Pulu Yao Township.

Lipu is known as "China's hanger capital." The city is home to about 100 hanger companies, which have manufactured "billions" of clothes hangers that are used throughout the world, and distributed by companies such as Target and IKEA.

Other industries include a food processing plant which makes packaged snacks.

Fengyu Cave (丰鱼岩) is found in Lipu.

Climate

References 

County-level divisions of Guangxi
Administrative divisions of Guilin